Atagabalin (PD-0200,390) is a drug developed by Pfizer and related to gabapentin, which similarly binds to the α2δ calcium channels (1 and 2). It was under development as a treatment for insomnia, but was discontinued following unsatisfactory trial results.

See also
 4-Methylpregabalin
 Gabapentin enacarbil
 PD-217,014

References

Abandoned drugs
Amino acids
Calcium channel blockers
GABA analogues
Hypnotics
Pfizer brands
Cyclopentanes